Triko Gatehun (born 1 January 1995) is an Israeli football left defender. He currently plays for Maccabi Jaffa.

Career 
On 9 February 2022 signed the Liga Alef club Maccabi Jaffa. In the end of the season Jaffa promoted to the Liga Leumit, after 12 years in Liga Alef.

Honours 
 Hapoel Kfar Saba
Liga Leumit: 2018–19

 Maccabi Jaffa
Liga Alef: 2021–22

References

External links 
 

1995 births
Living people
Israeli footballers
Hapoel Haifa F.C. players
Hapoel Nof HaGalil F.C. players
Ironi Tiberias F.C. players
Hapoel Kfar Saba F.C. players
Hapoel Rishon LeZion F.C. players
Maccabi Jaffa F.C. players
Liga Leumit players
Israeli Premier League players
Footballers from Haifa
Israeli people of Ethiopian-Jewish descent
Association football defenders
Association football midfielders
Israeli Jews